Bradford-Felter Tanglewood, owned and operated by the Cincinnati Park Board, is a  city park in the neighborhood of Mount Airy in Cincinnati, Ohio. The park board obtained an additional  in 1978, half of which they purchased and the other half donated by Dr. Ray Tully Bradford and his wife. In the years since other land donations and purchases were made, resulting in the current land area.

References

Parks in Cincinnati